Pepijn "Pep" Lijnders (born 24 January 1983) is a Dutch football manager. He is an assistant manager of Premier League club Liverpool.

Career
Lijnders began his managerial career in 2002 with PSV Eindhoven, helping with youth training and individual player development. In 2006, he moved to Porto and helped develop their youth academy, working under guidance of Vítor Frade and Luís Castro and implementing the Tactical Periodisation ideas on the 611 project. During his time in the club he worked under Jesualdo Ferreira, André Villas-Boas, Vítor Pereira and Paulo Fonseca. In 2014, he moved to Liverpool and assisted Brendan Rodgers and Jürgen Klopp as assistant coach, as well as First Team trainer with Klopp.

On 2 January 2018, Lijnders accepted the managerial job at NEC in the Dutch Eerste Divisie. He signed a contract of one year and a half. On 17 May 2018, Lijnders was sacked after NEC failed to gain promotion to the Eredivisie in the promotion play-offs.

He returned to the Liverpool coaching staff on 5 June 2018. He was part of the coaching staff that helped Liverpool to their sixth UEFA Champions League win on 1 June 2019 and their 19th league title win in the 2019–20 season.

In 2022, Lijnders published his first book, Intensity: Our Identity, an inside account of Liverpool's 2021-22 season. Later that year, with the club struggling for form the following season, Lijnders was forced to defend himself against accusations that his book had "exposed" Liverpool's secrets.

Honours
Liverpool
Premier League: 2019–20
FA Cup: 2021–22
EFL Cup: 2021–22
FA Community Shield: 2022
UEFA Champions League: 2018–19; runner-up: 2021–22
UEFA Super Cup: 2019
FIFA Club World Cup: 2019

References

External links
Liverpool Profile
Sport.de Profile

1983 births
Living people
People from Horst aan de Maas
Association football coaches
Dutch football managers
Eerste Divisie managers
NEC Nijmegen managers
Liverpool F.C. non-playing staff
PSV Eindhoven non-playing staff
Sportspeople from Limburg (Netherlands)
FC Porto non-playing staff
Dutch expatriate sportspeople in England
Dutch expatriate sportspeople in Portugal
21st-century Dutch non-fiction writers